Krupina District (okres Krupina) is a district in
the Banská Bystrica Region of central Slovakia. Until 1918, the district was in the county of Kingdom of Hungary Hont County.

Municipalities

References 

Districts of Slovakia
Geography of Banská Bystrica Region